Rotenboden (also spelled Rotaboda) is a village of Liechtenstein, located in the municipality of Triesenberg. It is the highest settlement in Liechtenstein at 850m elevation.

Geography
It is a mountain village that lies above Vaduz and Triesen, in the center of the country to the north of Triesenberg.

References

Villages of Liechtenstein